Pardes House Grammar School is a 10–16 private, Orthodox Jewish, secondary school for boys in Finchley, Greater London, England. It was established in 1976 and since 2001, it has occupied the former Christ's College school building which is a grade II listed building that was constructed in 1860.

See also 
 History of Church End, Barnet

References

External links 

 

Jewish schools in England
Private schools in the London Borough of Barnet
Private boys' schools in London
Educational institutions established in 1976
1976 establishments in England
Finchley
Grade II listed buildings in the London Borough of Barnet